The European Court of Human Rights has delivered many judgements and decisions in cases where special limitations for legal professions were concerned. These include:

Freedom of speech
Casado Coca v. Spain (No. 15450/89, 1994)
 Schöpfer v. Switzerland (No. 25405/94, 1998)
Wille v. Liechtenstein
Lavents v. Latvia
Pitkevich v. Russia 
Kudeshkina v. Russia 
Hajibeyli and Aliyev v. Azerbaijan (2018) applications. Nos. 6477/08 and 10414/08
L.P. and Carvalho v. Portugal (2019)
Baka v. Hungary (2014 and 2016)

Freedom of association and assembly
Ezelin v. France
Kiiskinen and Kovalainen v. Finland (No. 26323/95, 1999)
Grande Oriente d’Italia di Palazzo Giustiniani v. Italy (No. 35972/97, 2001)
N. F. v. Italy (No. 37119/97, 2001)
Maestri v. Italy (No. 39748/98, 2004)

Private life
K. A. and A. D. v. Belgium (No. 42758/98 and 45558/99, 2005)

References

External links
Written submissions International Commission of Jurists 2016

Article 10 of the European Convention on Human Rights
Article 11 of the European Convention on Human Rights
European Court of Human Rights case law
Legal ethics